Jeff Davis High School is a public high school located in Hazlehurst, Georgia, United States. The school is part of the Jeff Davis County School District, which serves Jeff Davis County.
The mascot of the school, like the rest of the Jeff Davis County School District is the Yellow Jacket. The mascot image is based off the Georgia Institute of Technology Yellow Jacket with the black replaced with a navy color.

References

External links
Jeff Davis High School
Jeff Davis County School District

Schools in Jeff Davis County, Georgia
Public high schools in Georgia (U.S. state)